The Rembrandts is the first album by the American pop rock duo The Rembrandts released on September 4, 1990, by Atco Records.

Track listing

Personnel

The Rembrandts
 Phil Solem – vocals, electric and acoustic guitars, keyboards
 Danny Wilde – vocals, acoustic guitars, bass guitar, keyboards, percussion

Additional personnel
 David Zeman – Hammond organ, Wurlitzer electric piano, accordion
 Pat Mastelotto – drums, percussion

Production
 Produced, recorded and mixed by The Rembrandts
 Recorded and mixed at "Dan's Garage"
 Mastered by Stephen Marcussen

Charts

References

Sources
 http://www.therembrandts.net/rembrandts.html

External links
 Personnel & Production at discogs

1990 debut albums
The Rembrandts albums
Atlantic Records albums